The Regina Pats are a junior ice hockey team that plays in the Western Hockey League. The Pats are based out of Regina, Saskatchewan and Brandt Centre is their home arena. The Regina Pats are the oldest major junior hockey franchise in the world that have continuously operated from their original location and use the same name. They began operations in 1917.  They were originally named the Regina Patricia Hockey Club, after Princess Patricia of Connaught, the granddaughter of Queen Victoria and daughter of the Governor General (the Duke of Connaught). The team name was also associated with the Princess Patricia's Canadian Light Infantry, named for the same Princess, to the point that Pats sweaters still bear the regimental badge and "PPCLI" flash as a shoulder patch. In 2017 the club celebrated its 100th anniversary. Games are broadcast on 620 CKRM radio.

History
In 1923, the team's name was shortened to the Pats.  For the 1927–28 season the Pats merged with the Regina Falcons and called themselves the Regina Monarchs.  The team went on to win the Memorial Cup that year and changed back to the Pats nickname in 1928–29.  During the 1940s and 1950s the club was a farm team for the Montreal Canadiens.

The Pats played in the Saskatchewan Junior Hockey League from 1946 to 1948, the Western Canada Junior Hockey League (WCJHL) from 1948 to 1956, and then the revived Saskatchewan Junior Hockey League (SJHL) from 1956 to 1966.  A charter member of the WCHL (currently called the WHL) in 1966, the Pats returned to the Saskatchewan Junior Hockey League in 1968 so that they could qualify for the Memorial Cup, winning the league title in their first year. They returned to the WCHL for good in 1970. In their place the Regina Blues were formed as their farm team in the SJHL. The Blues folded in 1982. In 1977, they moved from Regina Exhibition Stadium to the adjacent and brand-new Agridome, since renamed the Brandt Centre. The Regina Pats are now owned by Brandt owners Shaun and Gavin Semple.

Championships
The Pats have been Memorial Cup (national Canadian junior hockey) champions 4 times (1925,1928,1930 and 1974) and western Canadian junior hockey champions 14 times (winning the Abbott Cup, precursor to major junior hockey and the WHL, in 1919, 1922, 1925, 1928, 1930, 1933, 1950, 1952, 1955, 1956, 1958 and 1969 and winning the WJHL title in 1974 and the WHL title in 1980).  They were Saskatchewan junior hockey champions in 1918 (no inter-provincial or national championship play existed until 1919).

The Pats have appeared in more Memorial Cups than any other team (15), winning 4 times and finishing as the runner-up 9 times.  They have been Memorial Cup hosts (either solely or jointly) 7 times: 1947, 1955, 1957, 1969, 1980, 2001 and 2018.

The club has twice won the Scotty Munro Memorial Trophy as Western Hockey League regular season champions – in 1973–74 and 2016–17.

WHL finals appearances
1966–67: Loss, 1–4 vs Moose Jaw
1971–72: Loss, 1–4 vs Edmonton
1973–74: Win, 4–0 vs Calgary
1979–80: Win, 4–1 vs Victoria
1981–82: Loss, 1–4 vs Portland
1983–84: Loss, 3–4 vs Kamloops
2016–17: Loss, 2–4 vs Seattle

Coaches

John Paddock is the current general manager and head coach. Brad Herauf and Ken Schneider are assistant coaches.

Players

Current roster
Updated January 13, 2023.

 
 

 

 

 

 

 

 

 
 
 

|}

Player sweaters retired
 # 1 Ed Staniowski
 # 7 Jordan Eberle
 # 8 Brad Hornung
 # 9 Clark Gillies
 #12 Doug Wickenheiser
 #14 Dennis Sobchuk
 #15 Jock Callander
 #16 Dale Derkatch
 #16 Mike Sillinger
 #17 Bill Hicke

NHL alumni

Murray Armstrong
Dean Arsene
Carter Ashton
Murray Balfour
Dave Balon
Victor Bartley
Sandy Beadle
Norm Beaudin
Shawn Belle
Gordon Berenson
Dwight Bialowas
Mike Blaisdell
Buzz Boll
Derek Boogaard
Gary Bromley
Adam Brooks
Glen Burdon
Kyle Burroughs
Garth Butcher
Gord Buttrey
Lyndon Byers
Shawn Byram
Kyle Calder
Drew Callander
Jock Callander
Les Colwill
Barry Cummins
Les Cunningham
Scott Daniels
Brandon Davidson
Lorne Davis
Don Deacon
Nathan Dempsey
Robert Dirk
Ken Doraty
Duke Dukowski
Rocky Dundas
Jordan Eberle
Garry Edmundson
Craig Endean
Aut Erickson
Garnet Exelby
Todd Fedoruk
Brent Fedyk
Dunc Fisher
Cale Fleury
Ron Flockhart
Dan Focht
Bill Folk
Jimmy Franks
Kyle Freadrich
Jeff Friesen
Stan Gilbertson
Clark Gillies
Dave Goertz
Butch Goring
Johnny Gottselig
Dirk Graham
Stu Grimson
Libor Hajek
Taylor Hall
Kevin Haller
Josh Harding
Terry Harper
Bill Hay
Jamie Heward
Bill Hicke
Ernie Hicke
Josh Holden
Terry Hollinger
Bruce Holloway
Fran Huck
Dryden Hunt
Earl Ingarfield, Jr.
Frank Ingram
Barret Jackman
Mark Janssens
Frank Jerwa
Greg Joly
Petr Kalus
Boyd Kane
Bob Kirkpatrick
Morgan Klimchuk
Nikolai Knyzhov
Kevin Krook
Robbie Laird
Brad Lauer
Brian Lavender
Jim Leavins
Bill LeCaine
Gary Leeman
Jake Leschyshyn
Ed Litzenberger
Reed Low
Len Lunde
Brett Lysak
Kim MacDougall
Al MacInnis
Josh Mahura
Martin Marincin
Nevin Markwart
Paul Masnick
Frank Mathers
Jim Mathieson
Jim McGeough
Stu McNeill
Barrie Meissner
Dave Michayluk
Brad Miller
John Miner
Gerry Minor
Garrett Mitchell
Derek Morris
Alex Motter
Garth Murray
Dmitri Nabokov
Rod Norrish
Filip Novak
Selmar Odelein
Colton Orr
Greg Pankewicz
Garry Peters
Ronald Petrovicky
Eric Pettinger
Gord Pettinger
Rich Preston
Glenn Resch
Jack Rodewald
Rick Rypien
Don Saleski
Wally Schreiber
Jeff Shantz
Mike Sillinger
Trevor Sim
Jason Smith
Ken Smith
Ron Snell
Dennis Sobchuk
Gene Sobchuk
Brian Spencer
Al Staley
Ed Staniowski
Sam Steel
Chandler Stephenson
Evan Stephenson
Art Strobel
Todd Strueby
Brad Stuart
Greg Tebbutt
Colten Teubert
Esa Tikkanen
Denis Tolpeko
Doug Trapp
Rob Tudor
Al Tuer
Bob Turner
Aud Tuten
Darren Veitch
Austin Wagner
Gord Wappel
Jordan Weal
Doug Wickenheiser
David Wilkie
Eddie Wiseman
Alex Wood
Larry Wright
Dmitriy Yakushin
Egor Zamula

NHL first round drafted Pats

 2016 – Sam Steel – Drafted 30th overall by the Anaheim Ducks
2013 – Morgan Klimchuk- Drafted 28th overall by the Calgary Flames
2008 – Colten Teubert- Drafted 13th overall by the Los Angeles Kings
2008 – Jordan Eberle- Drafted 22nd overall by the Edmonton Oilers
2007 – Nick Ross- Drafted 30th overall by the Phoenix Coyotes
 1999 – Barret Jackman- Drafted 17th overall by the St. Louis Blues.
 1998 – Brad Stuart – Drafted 3rd overall by the San Jose Sharks.
 1996 – Josh Holden – Drafted 12th overall by the Vancouver Canucks.
 1996 – Derek Morris – Drafted 13th overall by the Calgary Flames.
 1994 – Jeff Friesen – Drafted 11th overall by the San Jose Sharks.
 1992 – Jason Smith – Drafted 18th overall by the New Jersey Devils.
 1989 – Mike Sillinger – Drafted 11th overall by the Detroit Red Wings.
 1989 – Kevin Haller – Drafted 14th overall by the Buffalo Sabres.
 1989 – Jamie Heward – Drafted 16th overall by the Pittsburgh Penguins.
 1985 – Brent Fedyk – Drafted 8th overall by the Detroit Red Wings.
 1984 – Selmar Odelein – Drafted 21st overall by the Edmonton Oilers.
 1983 – Nevin Markwart – Drafted 21st overall by the Boston Bruins.
 1981 – Garth Butcher – Drafted 10th overall by the Vancouver Canucks.
 1980 – Doug Wickenheiser – Drafted 1st overall by the Montreal Canadiens.
 1980 – Darren Veitch – Drafted 5th overall by the Washington Capitals.
 1980 – Mike Blaisdell – Drafted 11th overall by the Detroit Red Wings.
 1974 – Greg Joly – Drafted 1st overall by the Washington Capitals.
 1974 – Clark Gillies – Drafted 4th overall by the New York Islanders.
 1971 – Larry Wright – Drafted 8th overall by the Philadelphia Flyers.
 1968 – Ron Snell – Drafted 14th overall by the Pittsburgh Penguins.

Notable players
Baseball great Larry Walker once tried out for the Regina Pats as a goaltender.
Milwaukee Brewers Outfielder Nyjer Morgan had a stint with the Regina Pats in 1999–2000.  He played 7 games for the Pats, registering 2 goals and 20 penalty minutes.
 MLB pitcher Dustin Molleken played a single game with the Regina Pats.

Season-by-season results
Note: GP = Games played, W = Wins, L = Losses, T = Ties, OTL = Overtime losses, GF = Goals for, GA = Goals against, Pts = Points

Notes

SAJHL seasons
1969 Won League, Won Abbott Cup, Lost 1969 Memorial Cup
Regina Pats defeated Moose Jaw Canucks 4-games-to-none
Regina Pats defeated Weyburn Red Wings 4-games-to-1 SAJHL CHAMPIONS
Regina Pats defeated Lethbridge Sugar Kings (AJHL) 4-games-to-2
Regina Pats defeated Dauphin Kings (MJHL) 4-games-to-3 ABBOTT CUP CHAMPIONS
Montreal Jr. Canadiens (OHA) defeated Regina Pats 4-games-to-none
1970 Lost Final
Regina Pats defeated Saskatoon Olympics 4-games-to-1
Weyburn Red Wings defeated Regina Pats 4-games-to-2

Team records

CHL records
Canadian Hockey League records held by Regina Pats:

 Most ties in one season with overtime, with 14 ties in 72 games in 2002–03
 Longest winless streak with 36 winless games from October 23, 1976 through January 23, 1977
 Longest winless streak on the road with 36 games from October 3, 1976 through March 27, 1977
 2nd most consecutive 40 win seasons with 7 from 1979–80 to 1985–86

See also
 List of ice hockey teams in Saskatchewan
 Saskatchewan Royal Connections

References

External links
 Official team website
 Regina Pats alumni & history

 
Ice hockey clubs established in 1917
1917 establishments in Saskatchewan
Western Hockey League teams